Frederick Stanton may refer to:

 Frederick Perry Stanton (1814–1894), member of the United States House of Representatives from Tennessee
 Frederick Stanton (RAF officer) (1895–1979), British World War I flying ace
 Frederick Lester Stanton (1873–1945), American orthodontist

See also
Fredrik Stanton, political scientist